Addington Highlands (2016 population 2,323) is a township in central eastern Ontario, Canada, in the County of Lennox and Addington. Bon Echo Provincial Park is located primarily in Addington Highlands.

History
Addington Highlands was formed in 1998 through the amalgamation of the Township of Kaladar, Anglesea and Effingham with the Township of Denbigh, Abinger and Ashby.

This area was first settled following the construction of the Addington Road in 1857. It was originally named Scouten after its first postmaster. The old CPR rail bed passing through the town has become part of the Trans Canada Trail.

Geography

Communities
Addington Highlands Township comprises the communities of Addington, Bishop Corners, Caverlys Landing, Cloyne, Denbigh, Ferguson Corners, Flinton, Flinton Corners, Glastonbury, Glenfield, Kaladar, Massanoga, McCrae, Northbrook, Rose Hill, Slate Falls, Vennachar, Vennachar Junction and Weslemkoon.

The township's municipal offices are located in Flinton. Kaladar is located at the junction of Highway 7 and Highway 41.

Lakes
Lakes of notable size within the township boundaries are:

 Ashby Lake
 Ashby White Lake
 Barker Lake
 Brooks Lake
 Browns Lake
 Deerock Lake
 Denbigh Lake
 Effingham Lake
 Joeperry Lake
 Long Malloy Lake
 Mazinaw Lake
 Otter Lake
 Lake Sheldrake
 Shabomeka Lake
 Skootamatta Lake
 Weslemkoon Lake
 Trout Lake

Demographics

Parks and recreation

Addington Highlands contains the Kaladar Pine Barrens Conservation Reserve and the majority of Bon Echo Provincial Park.

See also
 List of municipalities in Ontario
List of townships in Ontario

References

External links

Official website

1998 establishments in Ontario
Lower-tier municipalities in Ontario
Municipalities in Lennox and Addington County
Township municipalities in Ontario
Populated places established in 1998